The following are events in 1874 which are relevant to the development of association football. Included are events in closely related codes, such as the Sheffield Rules.

Events
 7 March – Scotland defeat 2–1 England at Hamilton Crescent in Glasgow before a crowd of 7,000.
 14 March – Oxford University defeat Royal Engineers 2–0 in the third FA Cup Final. Played at the Kennington Oval in south London, the attendance is 2,000.
 21 March – The inaugural Scottish Cup Final is played at Hampden Park. Queen's Park defeat Clydesdale 2–0 before a crowd of 3,000.

Clubs founded

England
 Aston Villa
 Bolton Wanderers
 Macclesfield Town
 Northwich Victoria

Scotland
 Greenock Morton
 Hamilton Academical
 Heart of Midlothian (Hearts)

Domestic cups

Births
 20 April – Steve Bloomer (d. 1938), England international forward in 23 matches (1895–1907), scoring 28 goals.
 25 April – Tom Booth (d. 1939), England international; over 100 appearances for Blackburn Rovers and Everton.
 2 November – Thomas Baddeley (d. 1946), England international goalkeeper in five matches (1903–1904); over 300 appearances for Wolverhampton Wanderers.
 2 November – Herbert Banks (d. 1947), England international forward.
 31 December – Walter Bennett (d. 1908), England international and two-time FA Cup winner with Sheffield United.

Deaths
 14 March – Alfred Goodwyn (b. 1850), England defender in the 1873 match against Scotland. Member of the Royal Engineers team in the 1872 FA Cup Final. The first international footballer to die (as a result of a riding injury in India).

References

 
Association football by year